3 is the third studio album by German electronic music producer Pole. It was released by Kiff SM and Matador Records in 2000.

Track listing

References

2000 albums
Pole (musician) albums